English singer Jessie J has released five studio albums, one extended play (which was also her first live album), nineteen singles (including four as a featured artist), twenty-one music videos, and five promotional singles.

Jessie J released her debut single, "Do It like a Dude", in the United Kingdom in November 2010, where it peaked at number two on the UK Singles Chart. It also reached number eight in New Zealand. Her follow-up single, "Price Tag", which featured B.o.B, was released in late January 2011, spending two weeks at number-one in the UK; selling over a million copies as of January 2012. The single also reached number 23 on the Billboard Hot 100 in the United States and peaked at number-one in France, Ireland, New Zealand, while reaching the top three in Australia, Germany and the Netherlands. Her debut album, Who You Are, was released in February 2011 and reached number two on the UK Albums Chart. It also reached the top 10 in Australia, Canada, Ireland and New Zealand, and number 11 in the US. The album's third single, "Nobody's Perfect", peaked at number nine in the UK, while its fourth single, "Who's Laughing Now", peaked at 16. The fifth single from the album, "Who You Are", earned Jessie a fourth top-ten hit in December 2011, when it peaked at number eight. A non-album single, "Domino", was released in some territories, peaking at number three in New Zealand, number five in Australia and became her first top ten single on the US Billboard Hot 100; peaking at number six. The track was later included on the repackaged edition of Who You Are in the UK and was released as the sixth single and became her second number-one single in the UK in January 2012. A seventh single, "LaserLight" taken from the platinum edition of the album it was released in May 2012; reaching the top 10 in the UK and Ireland. As a result of this, Cornish became the first British female to have six top-ten singles from the same album.

The campaign for the second studio album Alive was launched in May 2013, with the worldwide release of "Wild". Featuring rappers Big Sean and Dizzee Rascal, the track reached number five in the United Kingdom and number six in Australia. A second single—"It's My Party"—preceded the release of the album on 15 September. "Alive" was released on 20 September 2013. The third and final single, Thunder, was released on 8 December 2013, and reached 18 in the UK and Ireland.

Jessie J also appeared as a guest vocalist on James Morrison's single "Up" in November 2011. The single, released from the album The Awakening, reached number 30 in the United Kingdom. In December 2012, Jessie J featured on singer Daley's single "Remember Me"; a track which went on to reach number 24 in the UK. She also featured in "Calling All Hearts" with Robin Thicke and DJ Cassidy in spring 2014.

Jessie J started the promotion of her third album with "Bang Bang", a collaboration with Ariana Grande and Nicki Minaj. The song debuted at number one in the UK and reached number three in the US. The next single, "Burnin Up" was a minor hit, peaking at number 86 on the US Billboard Hot 100 and number 100 on the Canadian Hot 100. The single peaked at number 73 in the UK. On 13 October 2014, Sweet Talker was released worldwide.

In 2018 Jessie J released her fourth album R.O.S.E. in four parts, available as four separate EPs, titled Realisations, Obsessions, Sex, and Empowerment. The titles create an acronym for Rose, her mother's name and her favorite flower. The four EPs were released on 22, 23, 24, and 25 May.

Studio albums

Extended plays

Singles

As lead artist

As featured artist

Promotional singles

Guest appearances

Other charted songs

Music videos

As lead artist

As featured artist

Guest appearances

Songwriting credits

Notes

References

Discographies of British artists
Pop music discographies
Discography

es:Jessie J#Discografía y videografía